Nelly Adamson Landry (28 December 1916 – 22 February 2010) was a tennis player from Belgium (became French citizen after marriage). She was the 1948 women's singles champion at the French Championships beating Shirley Fry. She had been a finalist in 1938, losing to Simonne Mathieu, and reached again the final in 1949, losing to Margaret Osborne duPont.

According to John Olliff of The Daily Telegraph and the Daily Mail, Landry was ranked in the world top 10 in 1946 and 1948 (no rankings issued from 1940 through 1945), reaching a career high of World No. 7 in these rankings in 1946.

Nelly Adamson married Pierre Henri Landry in February 1937 and subsequently Marcel Renault, both former French tennis players.

Grand Slam finals

Singles (1 title, 2 runners-up)

Doubles (1 runner-up)

Grand Slam singles tournament timeline

R = tournament restricted to French nationals and held under German occupation.

1In 1946 and 1947, the French Championships were held after Wimbledon.

See also 
 Performance timelines for all female tennis players who reached at least one Grand Slam final

References

1916 births
2010 deaths
French Championships (tennis) champions
Belgian female tennis players
French female tennis players
Naturalized citizens of France
Sportspeople from Bruges
Grand Slam (tennis) champions in women's singles